Origin Housing is a Housing Association operating in London and Hertfordshire in the United Kingdom. Origin Housing own and manage over 7,000 homes and has a turnover of approximately £57.9 million.

The current structure was formed in 2010 following the merger of Origin Group (Origin Housing Group Ltd.), SPH Housing (St. Pancras & Humanist Housing Association Ltd.,) and Griffin Homes (the Griffin Housing Association).

The St. Pancras & Humanist Housing Association (originally the Humanist Housing Association, part of the British Humanist Association) was formed out of the British humanist movement in order to provide accommodation for needy and elderly non-religious people, who faced discrimination from a housing sector that discriminated against them.

References

^ 3.Origin Website 2015

Housing associations based in England
Housing organisations based in London
Secularism in the United Kingdom
Ethical movement